Billy Leslie (born October 14, 1987) is an American former professional racing driver. He is the son of former NASCAR Busch Series driver Tracy Leslie. He has previously competed in the ARCA Racing Series with one win in 2007 at Winchester Speedway and six top-10's.

Racing career
Leslie first made his ARCA Re/Max Series debut in 2005 at the age of seventeen driving for Lee Leslie in the No. 44 Ford at Salem Speedway, where he would finish 25th due to a crash. He would make four more starts during the year with a best finish of 13th at Lake Erie Speedway. He would return in 2006, mostly driving the No. 2 for Hixson Motorsports, Eddie Sharp Racing, and DGM Racing, where he would score two top-10's, including a third place finish at Winchester Speedway.

Leslie would remain in the series the following year in 2007, now driving the No. 18 Ford for his father Tracy. He would start his season at Salem, where he would finish 21st due to a crash. At his next race at Winchester, he would start eighth, and would lead the final 60 laps on route to his first and only ARCA Re/Max Series win ahead of Brian Keselowski. He would make nine more starts and would score two more top-10's that year. He would remain with in the No. 18 in 2008, only earning one top-10 at Berlin Raceway, where he would finish sixth.

In 2009, Leslie would run in three races, crashing at Rockingham Speedway and suffering a suspension issue at Mansfield Motorsports Park. In his final race of the year at Berlin, Leslie was involved in a frightening crash of the sixth lap, where he would run off course on the berm outside the second turn and would attempt to get back onto the track, which caused him to hit the tire barrier at turn three and go off the track, where he would flip a number of times before the car came to a rest in the forest outside the track. He would escape with minor injuries. After failing to start at Palm Beach International Raceway in the No. 17 Ford for Andy Belmont, he would not compete in ARCA competition again.

Afterwards, he would run in the CRA Super Series, first racing in the Southern division before racing in the main series from 2011 to 2012.

Motorsports results

ARCA Racing Series
(key) (Bold – Pole position awarded by qualifying time. Italics – Pole position earned by points standings or practice time. * – Most laps led.)

References

1987 births
Living people
NASCAR drivers
ARCA Menards Series drivers
Racing drivers from Michigan
People from Algonac, Michigan